The California Rangers were California's first statewide law enforcement agency, formed in 1853 to deal particularly with the outlaw gangs troubling the Gold Country during the early 1850s, and was commanded by Captain Harry Love. The California Rangers were also considered to be part of California's early state militia, one of the predecessors to the current California Army National Guard, with its members holding rank within that state military force. The original posse disbanded following their success in bringing the violent Five Joaquins gang to justice.

As California's first state marshals, the California Rangers were the precursor of all later California state police, and state-level criminal investigators, including the Special Agents of the California Department of Justice, which is a state-wide law enforcement/criminal investigative force that exists in similar fashion in other states; such as in Texas with the famous Texas Rangers.

History
After years of robbery and killing in California's Gold Country, the "Five Joaquins" gang had been identified as being responsible for more than twenty murders.  Citizens of the State petitioned the Governor of California, John Bigler, to organize a military company to capture the Mexican outlaw Joaquin Murrieta and his gang The Five Joaquins.

The California State Rangers was created on May 17, 1853 by an act of the California State Legislature, and signed into law by Governor Bigler.  Appointed Captain, Harry S. Love,  was authorized to raise a Ranger Company of 20 men to kill or capture Murrieta and his gang and recover any stolen property found.  
On May 28, 1853, Captain Love raised his company of experienced Mexican War veterans, including his lieutenant Patrick Edward Connor and Capt. W J Howard, in Quartsburg, in Mariposa County.  Love and his Rangers captured many minor outlaws and horse thieves during the next two months of searching but found no trace of The Five Joaquins.  However, on July 12, 1853, they captured Jesus, a brother-in-law of the bandit. He promised to lead them to The Joaquin's hideout if they would let him go.

On July 25, 1853, the State Rangers encountered Murrieta and part of his band at a spring on the Arroyo Cantua near the Coast Range Mountains on the Tulare plains. Joaquin and his men tried to escape on horseback, but in the pursuit the Rangers killed Murrieta and his accomplice "Three Finger Jack," and two others.  They also took two prisoners, one of which was drowned crossing Tulare Slough in Tulare County during their return. The other was turned over to civil authority of Mariposa County for trial.  Later Love displayed Murrieta’s head and Jack’s hand for public viewing. After the California State Rangers mission was accomplished with the suppression of The Five Joaquins, the State Rangers were disbanded on August 29, 1853. Governor Bigler paid Captain Love $1,000 in reward money but the State Legislature decided that the members of the State Rangers had not been sufficiently rewarded and so voted to pay them an additional $5,000.

Legacy 
As the first state police force, the California State Rangers were the precursors of the later state police organizations.

California State Capitol Police was created in 1887, local to Sacramento. The Capitol Police later became the California State Police, a division under the General Services Administration which was merged with the California Highway Patrol in 1995, which manages traffic on freeways.

Regarding criminals already convicted in court, in 1996, the State Legislature enacted special funds to create the State Fugitive Teams under the California Department of Corrections and Rehabilitation to investigate and apprehend the most dangerous fugitives; to capture the most dangerous felons in the state. In 2005, the department created a new Division, the Office of Correctional Safety, with the Law Enforcement and Investigations Unit to oversee fugitive and gang investigations.

Although no longer called "Rangers," many of the roles and responsibilities of the former California Rangers are continued with the California State Special Agents working in the current California Department of Justice and the CBI, which ranges teams across the state providing investigative expertise, task forces, and other resources to law enforcement agencies.

References

THE CALIFORNIA RANGERS as told by Capt. W J Howard

See also

 California Department of Justice Special Agents – Modern counterpart to the historic Rangers
 List of law enforcement agencies in California
 Texas Rangers
 Arizona Rangers
 Colorado Mounted Rangers
 New Mexico Mounted Patrol
 Navajo Rangers
 Park ranger

Defunct law enforcement agencies of California
Defunct state law enforcement agencies of the United States
California Gold Rush
Defunct state agencies of California
California
Government agencies established in 1853
1853 establishments in California